Darragh Maguire (born 6 February 1976 in Dublin) is a former Irish footballer.

St Patrick's Athletic
Maguire was a central defender and he joined St. Pats from Newry Town F.C.
He was voted St Pats' Player of the Year in 2005 season and in 2006 was awarded captaincy of the team.

Darragh scored his first league goal against Rovers at the end of the 2001/02 season. He scored his last league goal for Pats in a 1-0 win in Cork on 18 October 2005.

Shamrock Rovers
Darragh signed for the Hoops in November 2007.

He made his competitive Rovers debut on the opening day of the 2008 League of Ireland season on 8 March 2008  and scored his first goal on 3 May.

Darragh won the Shamrock Rovers Player of the Year award for 2008.

He was released by the Hoops at the end of the 2009 season.

Honours
League of Ireland Cup: 2
 St Patrick's Athletic - 2000/01, 2003
SRFC Player of the Year:
 Shamrock Rovers - 2008
St Patrick's Athletic Player of the Year (1): 2005

References

1976 births
Living people
Association footballers from County Dublin
Republic of Ireland association footballers
Association football defenders
St Patrick's Athletic F.C. players
Shamrock Rovers F.C. players
League of Ireland players
Newry City F.C. players
NIFL Premiership players